The national routes of Chile are formed by the set of roads that connect a regional or provincial capital with a longitudinal or variant road to it, which are named by the President of the Republic, according to the road legislation of Chile. The characteristics that are considered to be catalogued as such are:

They connect cities with more than 30,000 inhabitants and that are the head of the region.
They are an important international corridor with neighboring countries for South American integration.
They connect or access ports where the ships of the State Maritime Company regularly arrive with a longitudinal route or regional heading.
They connect or access airports that are of regular scale of LAN Chile with the respective city.

A clear example is the Pan American Route 5, which is the main land communication route in Chile, which runs from Arica to the Chiloé archipelago, integrating the Chilean inhabitants from north to south. It also highlights the Austral highway, which extends from Puerto Montt to Villa O'Higgins, for tourism and commercial purposes.

Coverage
Chile has Highway coverage throughout the entire country with the exception of the southern Magallanes Region.

List
This is a list of Chilean Highways:

Chile Route 1
Chile Route 5
Chile Freeway 6
Chile Route 7
Chile Freeway 8
Chile Route 9
Chile Route 11
Chile Route 12
Chile Route 23
Chile Route 27
Chile Route 60
Chile Route 68
Chile Route 181
Chile Route 199
Chile Route 203
Chile Route 215
Autopista Central
Costanera Norte
Autopista del Sol (Chile)
Autopista del Itata
Vespucio Norte Express
Vespucio Sur
Troncal Sur

Highways
Highways
Chile
Highways